Tzazo (also known as Tzazon or Zano) was the brother to King Gelimer (530–534), the last Vandal ruler of the North Africa. Tzazo died on 15 December 533 during the Battle of Tricamarum, which finally brought to an end the Vandal Kingdom in North Africa.

Tzazo had not been involved in the earlier Battle of Ad Decimum because Godas, likely instigated by the Byzantine Emperor Justinian, had declared the Vandal province on the island of Sardinia independent from Carthage. King Gelimer was unaware that the Byzantines were planning an invasion and sent Tzazo to repress the rebellion, which he did.

After his defeat at Ad Decimum, Gelimer recalled the victorious Tzazo, Tzazo and his expeditionary force of 5,000 Vandals Gelimer went on the offensive. Their joined forces marched on Carthage, damaging the city’s aqueduct. Belisarius had spent the weeks since the Battle of Ad Decimum strengthening the city defences; he did not want to face a siege and he was beginning to grow suspicious of the loyalty of the Huns and other barbarians under his command, knowing some of his army was being approached by agents of Gelimer.

The Battle of Tricamarum took place on December 15, 533 between the armies of the Vandals, commanded by King Gelimer and his brother Tzazo, and the Byzantines commanded by Belisarius. The two forces met some 30 miles outside Carthage and the Roman cavalry immediately charged the Vandal lines, reforming and attacking two more times. In the third charge, Tzazo was cut down in front of Gelimer, who lost heart and fled to the mountains of Numidia. Gelimer soon realised that his position was hopeless and eventually gave himself up to the Emperor.

References

Vandal warriors
533 deaths
People killed in action
Year of birth unknown
Vandalic War